The Parc de Mon Repos is a public park of the city of Lausanne, Switzerland.

The villa located in the centre of the park hosted the headquarters of the International Olympic Committee from 1922 to 1967.

Gallery

See also 
 List of cultural property of national significance in Switzerland: Vaud

Notes and references

External links 

 Page on the website of the City of Lausanne

Parks in Lausanne